Poplar Ridge is an unincorporated community in Alberta, Canada within Red Deer County that is recognized as a designated place by Statistics Canada. The community is located on the north side of Highway 11 between Range Road 283 and Range Road 284.

Demographics 

See also 
List of communities in Alberta
List of designated places in Alberta

References 

Designated places in Alberta
Localities in Red Deer County